The 2009–10 Pacific-10 Conference men's basketball season began with practices on October 17, 2009 and ended with the Pac-10 Tournament on March 10–13, 2010 at the Staples Center in Los Angeles.

Pre-season
Tim Floyd, the head coach at USC resigned and was replaced by Kevin O'Neill, who was on the Arizona staff.
 Pre-season media day is scheduled for October 29.
 2009–10 PAC-10 Men's Basketball Media Poll:

1. 	California (25 first place votes)
2. 	Washington (7) 	
3. 	UCLA (5) 
4. 	Arizona 
5. 	Oregon State 
6. 	Oregon 	
7. 	Arizona State 
8. 	Washington State 	
9. 	USC 	
10. 	Stanford

 In the ESPN/USA poll: California, No. 12; Washington, No. 13. 
 In the AP poll: California, No. 13; Washington, No. 14.
 In the ESPN The Magazine: California, No. 10; Washington, No. 13; UCLA, No. 30; Oregon State, No. 36

Rankings

 November 2, 2009 – Washington (0–0) #14 (AP), #13 (Coaches); California (0–0) #13 (AP), #12 (Coaches)
 November 16, 2009 – Washington (3–0) #14 (AP), #14 (Coaches); California (2–0) #13 (AP), #12 (Coaches)
 November 23, 2009 – Washington (4–0) #14 (AP), #14 (Coaches); California (2–2) #23 (Coaches)
 November 30, 2009 – Washington (5–0) #12 (AP), #10 (Coaches); California (4–2) #25 (Coaches)
 December 7, 2009 – Washington (6–1) #17 (AP), #16 (Coaches)
 December 14, 2009 – Washington (6–2) #24 (AP), #21 (Coaches)
 December 21, 2009 – Washington (7–2) #22 (AP), #19 (Coaches)
 December 28, 2009 – Washington (9–2) #17 (AP), #16 (Coaches)
 January 4, 2010 – Washington (10–3) #24 (AP), #22 (Coaches)

Conference games
 January 23, 2010 – Five conference teams are tie for second place, and the Oregon schools are last.
 January 23, 2010 – Washington has lost all road games, including four conference games.
 January 31, 2009 – After playing 9 conference games, California and Arizona are tied for first place with 6 wins and 3 losses, followed by Arizona State and UCLA at third place with a 5–4 conference record.
 February 4, 2010 – Four teams tied for first place, Arizona, Arizona State, California and UCLA.

Conference tournament

 March 10–13, 2010 at the Staples Center in Los Angeles, California
 Tournament winner became the NCAA tournament automatic qualifier
 USC did not participate in the conference tournament this season

Head coaches

Sean Miller, Arizona
Herb Sendek, Arizona State
Mike Montgomery, California
Ernie Kent, Oregon
Craig Robinson, Oregon State
Johnny Dawkins, Stanford
Ben Howland, UCLA
Kevin O'Neill, USC
Lorenzo Romar, Washington
Ken Bone, Washington State

Post season

NCAA tournament
 Thurs., Mar. 18, – No. 11 Washington def.  No. 6 Marquette 80–78, San Jose, CA (East Region)
 Fri., Mar. 19, – No. 8 California def. No. 9 Louisville 77–62, Jacksonville, FL (South Region)
 Sat., Mar. 20 – Washington def. New Mexico 82–64, San Jose, Calif. (East Region)
 Sun., Mar. 21 – Duke def. California 68–53, Jacksonville, FL (South Region)
 Thu., Mar. 25 –  West Virginia def. Washington 69–56, Carrier Dome, Syracuse, New York (East Region)

NIT

 Tues., Mar. 18 – No. 8-seed Jacksonville def. No. 1-seed Arizona State 67–66, (First Round, Arizona State Bracket)

CBI

 Wed., Mar. 19 – Boston University def. Oregon State 96–78, 7 p.m. (First Round, Gill Coliseum)

Highlights and notes

November
 50 former Pac-10 players were listed on the NBA opening day rosters, the average of 5.0 player per conference team tops among all conferences, with 14 former UCLA players are on the teams.
 November 26, 2009 – UCLA's loss to Portland 74–47 was the worst defeat during the Ben Howland era.

December
 December 1, 2009 – UCLA head coach Ben Howland announced that by mutual agreement, sophomore forward Drew Gordon is no longer a member of the team. Gordon will transfer at the end of the school quarter.
 December 6, 2009 – After winning just one in their first four games, the Beavers won three games in a row.

January
 January 3, 2010 – USC Athletic Director Mike Garrett announced that the school is forfeiting the 2007–08 season's victories, not participating in any post season tournaments in 2010 and reducing the number of scholarships for two years for violation of NCAA rules.

March
Oregon State basketball coach Craig Robinson has agreed to a two-year contract extension, through the 2015–16 season.
 March 17, 2010 – California's Omondi Amoke was suspended for team rules violation going into the NCAA tournament.
 March 17, 2010 – Oregon head coach Ernie Kent's contract was terminated effective June 30.
 March 19, 2010 – Oregon athletic director Mike Bellotti step down to join ESPN as a football analyst.

June
 June 10, 2010 – NCAA to release the report of its investigation of the USC basketball team.
 June 10, 2010 – Colorado Buffaloes join the Pac-10 as its 11th member.

Awards and honors
Three guards from the Pac-10 Conference have been named to the pre-season John R. Wooden Award list: Nic Wise, Arizona; Jerome Randle, California; Isaiah Thomas, Washington.

Scholar-Athlete of the Year
 Senior Landry Fields, Stanford – Scholar-Athlete of the Year, presented by Toyo Tires

Player-of-the-Week

 Nov. 16 – Quincy Pondexter, WASH
 Nov. 23 – Klay Thompson, WSU
 Nov. 30 – Klay Thompson, WSU
 Dec. 7 – Quincy Pondexter, WASH
 Dec. 14 – Patrick Christopher, CAL
 Dec. 21 – Alex Stepheson, USC
 Dec. 28 – Mike Gerrity, USC
 Jan. 4 – Michael Dunigan, ORE
 Jan. 11 – Ty Abbott, ASU
 Jan. 18 – Quincy Pondexter, WASH
 Jan. 25 – Landry Fields, STAN
 Feb. 1 – Nic Wise, ARIZ
 Feb. 8 – Quincy Pondexter, WASH
 Feb. 15 – Jerome Randle, CAL
 Feb. 22 – Landry Fields, STAN
 Mar. 1 – Jamal Boykin, CAL
 Mar. 8 – Quincy Pondexter, WASH

All-Americans

All-Pac-10 teams
Player of The Year:  Jerome Randle, California
Freshman of The Year:  Derrick Williams, Arizona
Defensive Player of The Year: Seth Tarver, Oregon State
Most Improved Player of The Year: Nikola Vucevic, USC
Coach of The Year:  Herb Sendek, Arizona State

FIRST TEAM:

All-Academic

First Team:

Second Team:

USBWA All-District team

References